Soppin' the Gravy is an album by Mark O'Connor. It consists mostly of traditional Texas Fiddle music, with O'Connor's own piece, "Misty Moonlight Waltz", and an instrumental version of "Over the Rainbow". O'Connor can be seen on the cover with the white-painted fiddle that he used for competition. At the time of this album's release, O'Connor had won numerous fiddle championships, including a win in the National Old Time Fiddler's Contest Open division in 1979 and a 1975 win in the Grand Masters Contest in Nashville, Tennessee.

Track listing
"Soppin' the Gravy" – 1:52
"Misty Moonlight Waltz" (O'Connor) – 3:15
"College Hornpipe" – 1:43
"Calgary Polka" – 1:15
"Morning Star Waltz" – 1:54
"Peaches 'N' Cream" – 1:58
"Skater's Waltz" – 2:34
"Tennessee Wagoneer" – 1:49
"Yellow Rose Waltz" – 1:58
"Medley: Speed the Plow/The Maid Behind the Bar (Judy's Reel)/Teatottler's Reel (Temperance Reel Or The Devil in Georgia)" – 1:58
"Jesse Polka" – 1:59
"The Dawn Waltz (Virginia Moonlight Waltz)" – 2:00
"Wild Fiddler's Rag" – 1:57
"Over the Rainbow" (instrumental) (Harold Arlen, Yip Harburg) – 3:42

Personnel
Mark O'Connor - fiddle, rhythm guitar
Jerry Thomasson - (son of Benny Thomasson) - tenor guitar
Buck White - mandolin
Technical
Fred Cameron - recording engineer
Bill Wolf - mixing engineer, mastering
Marty O'Connor - executive producer
Gail Lipson - photography
Tim Garvin - cover design, calligraphy

Mark O'Connor albums
1979 albums
Rounder Records albums